Foss Upper Secondary School is an upper secondary school in Oslo, Norway. The school was founded in 1900. 

Secondary schools in Norway
Schools in Oslo
Educational institutions established in 1900
Grünerløkka
Oslo Municipality
1900 establishments in Norway